Paraburkholderia megapolitana is a gram-negative, catalase and oxidase-negative  aerobic, non-spore-forming, bacterium from the genus Paraburkholderia and the family Burkholderiaceae which was isolated from moss of poor nutrient plant communities from the southern coast of the Baltic Sea in Germany.

References

megapolitana
Bacteria described in 2007